Merry Go Boy (May 4, 1943 – July 7, 1967) was a highly influential Tennessee Walking Horse sire and two-time World Grand Champion. He is credited for producing the most desirable conformation type in his offspring.

Life

Merry Go Boy was foaled on May 4, 1943. He was sired by the stallion Merry Boy, and out of a mare named Wiser's Dimples. Merry Go Boy was black with a white star and near hind sock. He was bred by Archie Wiser of Wartrace, Tennessee, and sold to Wiser's brother Winston for $350 when he was a few weeks old. In 1944, Elroy Mallard from Georgetown, Kentucky bought a half-interest in Merry Go Boy. In 1948, Merry Go Boy was sold again to a Virginia owner for a then-record price of $55,000. Merry Go Boy was euthanized due to arthritis on July 7, 1967, at Belfast, Tennessee.

Career

Merry Go Boy won the weanling horse colt class at the Tennessee Walking Horse National Celebration in 1943. In 1944, he won the yearling colt class and the yearling championship. He won the two-year-old stallion class in 1945, and in the following year, 1946, won the three-year-old stallion/gelding junior stake and was then entered in the "big stake" or World Grand Championship, which he lost to Midnight Sun.
However, Merry Go Boy won the World Grand Championship title a year afterwards, in 1947, and again in 1948.

Merry Go Boy's last major win was in 1967, when he won the get of sire class at the Celebration.

Offspring

After his retirement from showing, Merry Go Boy was put to stud in 1954 at S.W. Beech's stables. He sired three World Grand Champions: Go Boy's Shadow, winner in 1955 and 1956 with Winston Wiser; Go Boy's Sundust, winner in 1967; and Go Boy's Royal Heir, winner in 1968. In the 1960 Breeders' National Futurity, 24 of the 46 awards were given to sons and daughters of Merry Go Boy, although it is not known what became of these horses after they matured. Merry Go Boy is credited with popularizing his black color and fine conformation within his breed.

Pedigree

References

Individual Tennessee Walking Horses
1943 animal births
World Grand Champion Tennessee Walking Horses